Koti Takar Kabin is a Bangladeshi romantic comedy produced by Ami Boni Kothachitra and directed by F I Manik. The film released in 2006 all over Bangladesh. It stars Shakib Khan, Apu Biswas, Razzak, Farooque, and Suchorita.

Plot

Cast
 Shakib Khan as Fahim Talukdar 
 Apu Biswas as Simran Shikder 
 Farooque as Mannab Talukdar 
 Razzak as Aslam Shikder 
 Dipjol as Sultan Talukdar
 Shuchorita 
 Sadek Bacchu
 Misha Sawdagor
 Afzal Sharif

Production

Music
The film's music was directed by Alauddin Ali.

Soundtrack
All songs composed by Alauddin Ali and penned by Kabir Bakul, Munshi Wadud and Mohammed Rafiquzzaman.

References

External links
 

2006 films
2006 romantic comedy films
Bengali-language Bangladeshi films
Bangladeshi romantic comedy films
Films scored by Alauddin Ali
2000s Bengali-language films